Abrams is a town in Oconto County, Wisconsin, United States. The population was 1,960 at the 2020 Census. The census-designated place of Abrams is located in the town.

History
Abrams was named after W. J. Abrams, Wisconsin legislator and former Mayor of Green Bay, Wisconsin.

Geography

Demographics
As of the census of 2020, there were 1,960 people. The racial makeup of the town was 95.8% White, 0.2% Black or African American, 0.80% Native American, 0.3% Asian, 0.1% Native Hawaiian or Pacific Islander, 0.3% other race, and 2.6% from two or more races. Hispanic or Latino of any race were 0.9% of the population.

Notable people

 C. J. Greaves, professional American off-road racing driver, was born in the town
 Johnny Greaves, professional American off-road racing driver, was born in the town
 Arthur J. Whitcomb, Wisconsin State Representative and lawyer, was born in the town
 Bob Wickman, Major League Baseball player, relief pitcher

References

External links
Town of Abrams Official Website

Towns in Oconto County, Wisconsin
Green Bay metropolitan area
Towns in Wisconsin